The Human Dog Sled Competition is an event held in February during the Winterfest celebration of Lowell, Massachusetts, USA. Each year, a field of approximately 32 teams compete against each other in a double elimination tournament to determine the National Human Dog Sled Champion. The teams consist of six persons including four sled pullers, a sled rider, and a sled pusher. The sled race is approximately 50 meters long and takes place along a snow-covered street in downtown Lowell. Team members often dress in wacky costumes and there is a prize for the most creative of attire. The Human Dogsled Competition has been recognized for several years by People for the Ethical Treatment of Animals (PETA) for its animal-friendly approach to winter fun. 

A variety of strategies are employed to gain victory. Some teams consist of burly football players who try to win by sheer power. Other teams consist of lightly built sprinters who try to win by having a pusher who may not weigh that much. 

In past years, ESPN has given brief coverage to the final matchups of the event. There is no prize money associated with this race.

External links
Lowell Winterfest
National Human Dogsled Championship

Massachusetts culture